The Juno Award for Underground Dance Single of the Year is an annual Canadian music award, presented by the Juno Awards to honour songs in underground dance music genres. Announced at the Juno Awards of 2021, it was presented for the first time at the Juno Awards of 2022.

The award was created as a split from the existing Juno Award for Dance Recording of the Year, due to the fact that the existing award is often dominated by commercial dance pop singles while leaving more underground and experimental dance music, such as music created by Black Canadian, First Nations or LGBTQ artists, underrepresented.

Qualifying recordings may feature “slow builds, hypnotic and repetitive arrangements that may include vocals, often extended in length, all developed for maximum utility on the dance floor by club DJs."

Winners and nominees

References

Underground Dance